Each team in the 2013 FIFA Club World Cup had to name a 23-man squad (three of whom must be goalkeepers) by the FIFA deadline of 29 November 2013. Injury replacements were allowed until 24 hours before the team's first match.

Al-Ahly

Manager:  Mohamed Youssef

Atlético Mineiro

Manager:  Cuca

Auckland City

Manager:  Ramon Tribulietx

Bayern Munich

Manager:  Pep Guardiola

Guangzhou Evergrande

Manager:  Marcello Lippi

Monterrey

Manager:  José Guadalupe Cruz

Raja CA

Manager:  Faouzi Benzarti

References

External links
FIFA Club World Cup Morocco 2013 - List of Players, FIFA.com

Squads
FIFA Club World Cup squads